Leslee Beyer (born June 4, 1948) is an American Democratic politician from the U.S. state of Oregon. He served in both houses of the Oregon Legislative Assembly for a decade, representing Springfield, until being appointed to the Oregon Public Utility Commission in 2001 by then-governor John Kitzhaber.

Early life
Lee Beyer was born on June 4, 1948 in Norfolk, Nebraska. Beyer received his education at the following institutions:
 BS, Management, University of Oregon, 1974
 Attended, Lane Community College

Personal life
Lee Beyer is married to Terry and together they have three children named Jon, Josh, and Megan. He is a Lutheran.

Career
In the 2010 legislative elections, Beyer was re-elected to his former seat in the Oregon State Senate, to succeed retiring senator Bill Morrisette. Lee's wife Terry Beyer, also a Democrat, serves in the Oregon House of Representatives.

Beyer has had the following political experience:
 Senator, Oregon State Senate, 2010–present
 Springfield City Councilor, 1986–1993;
 Representative, Oregon State House of Representatives, District 42, 1991–1998;
 House Democratic Whip

Beyer has been a member of the following committees:
 Member, Springfield City Planning Commission, 1978
 Chief Executive Officer, Oregon Public Utility Commission
 Member, Council of Utility Commissioners
 Member, Juvenile Crime Prevention Commission
 Member, Juvenile Task Force Subcommittee on Teen Runaways
 Member, Oregon Energy Planning Commission
 Member, Oregon Global Warming Commission
 Member, Oregon Public Utility Commission
 Member, Oregon Progress Board Benchmark Evaluation Task Force

External links 
 Campaign website
 Legislative website

References

People from Springfield, Oregon
Democratic Party Oregon state senators
Living people
1948 births
21st-century American politicians
People from Norfolk, Nebraska